Khairo may refer to

 Khairo, Punjab, Pakistan
 Khairo, Sindh, Pakistan